The 1966–67 Cypriot Cup was the 25th edition of the Cypriot Cup. A total of 16 clubs entered the competition. It began with the first round on 11 June 1967 and concluded on 2 July 1967 with the final which was held at GSP Stadium (1902). Apollon won their 2nd Cypriot Cup trophy after beating Alki 1–0 in the final.

Sources

See also
 Cypriot Cup
 1966–67 Cypriot First Division

Cypriot Cup seasons
1966–67 domestic association football cups
1966–67 in Cypriot football